Thelecythara mucronata is a species of sea snail, a marine gastropod mollusk in the family Pseudomelatomidae, the turrids and allies.

Description
The length of the shell attains 8.6 mm.

Distribution
T. mucronata can be found in the Gulf of Mexico, ranging from the coast of Texas south to Brazil. Fossils were found in Pliocene strata of Jamaica, age range : 3.6 to 2.588 Ma.

References

External links
 Rosenberg G., Moretzsohn F. & García E. F. (2009). Gastropoda (Mollusca) of the Gulf of Mexico, pp. 579–699 in Felder, D.L. and D.K. Camp (eds.), Gulf of Mexico–Origins, Waters, and Biota. Biodiversity. Texas A&M Press, College Station, Texas
 

mucronata
Gastropods described in 1896